Places is an album by American pianist and composer Brad Mehldau released on the Warner Bros. label in 2000.

Reception

AllMusic awarded the album 4½ stars and in its review by Richard S. Ginell, stated "the album is about the constancy of his personality and musical language, taking all of your personal mental baggage with you wherever you travel. This is an important album, one that anyone interested in piano jazz ought to check out". On All About Jazz, David Adler noted "Each piece is named for a particular place (hence the title), which Mehldau attempts to represent in musical terms. In short, Places is a concept album, and a particularly effective one. For the most part, Mehldau holds his prodigious chops in check, preferring instead to conjure moods and memories with subtle nuances". JazzTimes reviewer, Bill Shoemaker commented "In addition to being a technically dazzling pianist, Mehldau has an arch sense of nuance; by changing the touch of a single note or introducing a single beat's rest in a long serpentine line, Mehldau can turn a smile or a frown upside down".

Track listing 
All compositions by Brad Mehldau
 "Los Angeles" - 5:21  
 "29 Palms" - 5:09  
 "Madrid" - 6:07  
 "Amsterdam" - 3:38  
 "Los Angeles II" - 5:18  
 "West Hartford" - 5:39  
 "Airport Sadness" - 4:48  
 "Perugia" - 3:52  
 "A Walk in the Park" - 5:59  
 "Paris" - 6:30  
 "Schloss Elmau" - 6:32  
 "Am Zauberberg" - 7:07  
 "Los Angeles (Reprise)" - 3:28

Personnel 
Brad Mehldau - piano
Larry Grenadier - bass (tracks 1, 3, 6, 9, 11 and 13) 
Jorge Rossy - drums (tracks 1, 3, 6, 9, 11 and 13)

Credits 
Produced by Brad Mehldau
Engineered by  Bernie Kirsch
Mastering by Andrew Garver 
Art direction and design by Lawrence Azerrad 
Photography by Michael Lewis

References 

Warner Records albums
Brad Mehldau albums
2000 albums
Solo piano jazz albums